The beautiful skink (Trachylepis pulcherrima) is a species of skink found in the Democratic Republic of the Congo.

References

Trachylepis
Reptiles described in 1953
Taxa named by Gaston-François de Witte
Endemic fauna of the Democratic Republic of the Congo